Satya Raj Chaulagain (Nepali : सत्य राज चौलागाई) Born 19, May 1990 is an Nepali Film Director, Film Writer, Producer, Lyricist. For the past 11 years, Satya Raj has been continuously involved in Nepali films, actively working as a director in  Nepali Movies.

About and Biography 
Chaulagain began his professional career as an assistant director on the film "Mayako Barima" under the direction of Dayaram Dahal. He continued to progress in his career, serving as chief assistant director on films such as "Kohinoor", "Naike", "Ko Afno", "Bhag Sani Bhag", "Ke Ma Timro Hoina Ra", and "Ma Yesto Get Gauchhu". In addition to his work in the film industry, Chaulagain has directed numerous music videos and a few short films. In 2018, he made his directorial debut with "Anuraag", which was produced by Rishi Dhamala. The most popular songs in his career as a director are "Chahanchhu-2", "Aama", and "Mero Desh Nepal". He has been Nominated  in 7th National Rapti Music Award 2075 BS, from ‘ Yasto Saathi’ Lyricist  Movie Song Anurag

Songs

Movie

Awards

References 

Nepalese film directors
Living people